Wagon Mound refers to a number of subjects:
 Wagon Mound National Historic Landmark, a butte and camp near town of Wagon Mound, New Mexico
 Wagon Mound, New Mexico, the town
 Overseas Tankship (UK) Ltd v Morts Dock and Engineering Co Ltd, known as "Wagon Mound (No. 1)"
 Overseas Tankship (UK) Ltd v The Miller Steamship Co, known as "Wagon Mound (No. 2)"